The Ethiopia national under-16 basketball team is governed by the Ethiopian Basketball Federation (FTBB).(Amharic: ኢትዮጵያ የቅርጫት ኳስ ማህበር) 

It represents the country in international under-16 (under age 16) basketball competitions.

2015 African Championship
The team qualified for the 2015 FIBA Africa Under-16 Championship in Bamako, Mali. There, the team finished 11th. As a debutant, Ethiopia, managed by coach Kasa, beat Morocco in their opening game 58-52.

Ethiopia was able to compete well against all other teams except Tunisia. Tunisia won the match 81-53. Ethiopia produced 37 turnovers, which led to 30 points for Tunisia. Ethiopia's Leul Brhane Tafere finished with 16 points, slightly below his tournament average.

Overall, Ethiopia's player Leul Brhane Tafere finished as the tournament's top scorer as he achieved 18.5 points per game, ahead of Morocco's Sami Al Wariachi, who had 16.0 points per game.

Aftermath
Tafere was later selected by the NBA and the world governing body FIBA as one of Africa's top basketball players age 17 and under.

See also
Ethiopia men's national basketball team

References

External links
  Ethiopia at the FIBA website.
 Ethiopia  at Africabasket.com
  Archived records of Ethiopia team participations
 Addis Afros Basketball club - supporting Basketball in Ethiopia 

Men's national under-16 basketball teams
Basketball teams in Ethiopia
Basketball